Good vs. Evil may refer to:

 Good vs. Evil (TV series), an American fantasy television series 
 Good vs. Evil (album), the third studio album by American rapper KXNG Crooked (formerly known as Crooked I)
 Good vs. Evil II: The Red Empire, the sequel to the previous album by American rapper KXNG Crooked
 Conflict between good and evil

See also
 Good and evil (disambiguation)